Phil Hay may refer to:

 Phil Hay (footballer) (born 1938), Australian footballer for Hawthorn
 Phil Hay (screenwriter), American screenwriter

See also
Philip Hayes (disambiguation)
Philip Hays (born 1930), American illustrator